Rainbow Connection is the 49th studio album by country singer Willie Nelson. It was recorded in December 2000 and January 2001 at Willie's ranch near Spicewood, TX. 
Willie’s daughter Amy Nelson was just five years old when she first heard Kermit the Frog sing “Rainbow Connection” in The Muppet Movie, and she spent the next twenty years trying to talk her dad into recording it. In 2001, he finally did, with Amy—an accomplished musician in her own right—co-producing. 

Rainbow Connection was nominated for the 44th Grammy Award for Best Country Album.

Track listing 
"Rainbow Connection" (Paul Williams, Kenneth Ascher) – 4:29
"I'm Looking Over a Four-Leaf Clover" (Paul Edgar Johnson) – 2:30
"Ol' Blue" (Traditional) – 2:36
"Wise Old Me" (Amy Nelson) – 4:14
"Won't You Ride in My Little Red Wagon" (Rex Griffin) – 1:28
"Playmate" (Henry W. Petrie) – 1:37
"I'm My Own Grandpa" (Dwight Latham, Moe Jaffe) – 3:19
"Rock Me to Sleep" (Tom Hunter) – 3:16
"Playin' Dominoes and Shootin' Dice" (Tex Woods, O.D. Dobbs) – 2:46
"Wouldn't Have It Any Other Way" (Willie Nelson) – 1:55
"Outskirts of Town" (Casey Bill Weldon) – 7:20
"Just Dropped In (To See What Condition My Condition Was In)" (Mickey Newbury) – 3:42
"The Thirty-Third of August" (Mickey Newbury)– 4:33

Personnel 
Willie Nelson – Guitar, vocals
Matt Hubbard – Harmonica, electric bass, bongos, keyboards, electric piano
Amy Nelson – Vocals, background vocals, vocal harmony
Lana Nelson – Vocals
George Fowler - Background vocals
Paula Nelson – Vocals
Gabe Rhodes – Guitar
David Zettner – Pedal steel, electric bass, guitar

Chart performance

References 

2001 albums
Willie Nelson albums
Island Records albums